Zombie 108 is a 2012 Taiwanese horror film directed by , starring Yvonne Yao, Jack Kao, Dennis To and Chu Mu-yen.

Cast
 Yvonne Yao as Linda
  as Gangster Boss
  as Swat Captain
 Jack Kao as Swat Commander
 Dennis To as Swat
 Chu Mu-yen as Swat

Reception
Ho Yi of the Taipei Times wrote that "With a more than adequate beginning that recalls many blockbusters of its kind, the self-proclaimed horror B-movie gets off to a good start. Yet the momentum soon dissipates as the movie struggles to flesh out its story." Elizabeth Kerr of The Hollywood Reporter wrote that "Joe Chien fails to bring anything new to the table with this Asian take on the zombie-horror phenomenon; horror aficionados may still give the dying film a chance."

Mark Adams of Screen Daily wrote that while "The film starts well enough with the zombies (of the slow-moving variety) enthusiastic in their munching techniques and the cop’n’crooks liberal in their gunfire", the "action is only adequately staged" and the script is "pretty poor". Adrian Halen of HorrorNews.net wrote that "There are far too many ideas in the last segment that you tend to not care about any of them."

Pierce Conran of ScreenAnarchy wrote that "The film makes almost no sense and doesn't really seem to begin or end. It veers from one poorly thought out vignette to the next, with little rhyme or reason. It lacks a cohesive story, characters, scares, production values and just about anything that you consider important in a film. The only thing that marks it at all is its attitude: it is misogynist, apathetic and clearly demonstrates that the filmmakers couldn't give a damn about their audience."

References

External links
 
 

Taiwanese horror films
2012 horror films